Abu al-Walīd Muslim ibn al-Walīd al-Anṣārī (130 H/748 AD– 207 H/823 AD), also known as Ṣarī‘ al-Ghawānī ("The One Knocked Down by the Fair"), was among the finest poets of the early Abbasid period, and mawla of the Ansar. As worded by Hilary Kilpatrick, he was patronized by Abbasid dignitaries, one of the first masters of the "refined" badiʿ style, best known for wine and love songs, also composed panegyrics.

As worded by the Encyclopedia of Arabic Literature, he was born and brought up in Kufa. He moved to Baghdad in the reign of Harun al-Rashid before the Barmakid debacle of 187 H/794 AD.

He gained favour by Al Fadl bin Sahl, a wazeer in the reign of the seventh Abbasid caliph al-Maʾmūn and was appointed as a postmaster in Jurjān (Gorgan in present-day Iran) by al-Maʾmūn and remained and later in Isfahan. He withdrew from poetry after Al Fadl was murdered and led a lonely life until his death. He is buried in Gorgan.

Edition and translation
 M. J. de Goeje's edition (1875)

Notes
Poetsgate.com: ديوان صريع الغواني

References

740s births
823 deaths
Arabic-language poets
Muslim panegyrists
People from Kufa